Lachnocnema inexpectata is a butterfly in the family Lycaenidae. It is found in Tanzania.

References

Endemic fauna of Tanzania
Butterflies described in 1996
Taxa named by Michel Libert
Miletinae